Ulla Ģērmane (née Lodziņa, born 1971) is a former Latvian alpine skier, now a skiing coach.

Achievements 
She won the bronze medal in the downhill at the 1988 World Junior Championships and also competed in four other events, in addition to placing tenth in the downhill at the 1989 World Junior Championships.

She placed fourteenth in the downhill at the 1989 World Championships and competed in World Cup between 1988 and 1990, reaching as high as 4th place in February 1989 in Steamboat Springs.

Family 
Her brother Rodžers is a former alpine skier, later a bobsledder. Her daughter Dženifera Ģērmane is also an alpine skier. Her son Evert also trains in this sport.

References 

1971 births
Living people
Soviet female alpine skiers
Latvian female alpine skiers